Ephemerality is the quality of existing only briefly.

Ephemeral may also refer to:

 Ephemeral messaging, images or text that self-deletes a short time after receipt, or upon viewing by the recipient
 Ephemeral (EP), a 2009 EP by Pelican
 Ephemeral, a 2013 EP by Insomnium
 Ephemeral, a 1997 album by Synæsthesia (Canadian band)
 An ephemeral port is a short-lived transport protocol port for Internet Protocol (IP) communications

See also 
 Ephemera (disambiguation)
 Ephemeron, a data structure
 Ephemeris, a publication giving the positions of astronomical objects in the sky